Bramwell may refer to:

 Bramwell (TV series), a British television drama series
 Bramwell (name), a given name and surname
 Bramwell, Idaho, an unincorporated community
 Bramwell, West Virginia, a town in the U.S.